Klement is a given name and surname. People with that name include:

Given name
 Klement Gottwald (1896–1953), Czechoslovak politician
 Klement Slavický  (1910–1999), Czech composer
 Klement Steinmetz (1915–2001), Austrian football player

Surname
 Lidia Klement (1937–1964), Soviet singer
 Philipp Klement (born 1992), German footballer 
 Uta Klement (born 1962), German materials scientist and academic
 Václav Klement (1868–1938), Czech automotive pioneer
 Vera Klement (born 1929), American artist

See also 
 Clement (disambiguation)